Duke v R [1972] S.C.R. 917 was a decision by the Supreme Court of Canada on the Canadian Bill of Rights, concerning the right of an accused to make full answer and defence to a criminal charge.

Background
The accused in the case was charged with drunk driving contrary to the Criminal Code after having been taken to a police station and given a breathalyzer.  While the breathalyzer test results were given to the accused's lawyer, the breath sample itself was not.  This raised the concern as to whether the accused would be able to have a full defence, as is expected under common law rules of natural justice.  According to the Supreme Court, the legislative history of the Criminal Code indicated that it was intended that the accused need not be given breath samples.

The case thus involved section 2(e) of the Bill of Rights, which states that everyone has "the right to a fair hearing in accordance with the principles of fundamental justice for the determination of his rights and obligations."  In Duke, the Court considered the meaning of the term "fundamental justice."  This phrase had an ambiguous meaning, whereas the term natural justice was understood to provide certain procedural legal protections.

Decision
The Court found that fundamental justice was, for the purposes of this case, merely equivalent to natural justice.

As the Court wrote,

However, the author of the majority opinion, Chief Justice Gérald Fauteux, did say that he was not trying "to formulate any final definition" of fundamental justice.

The relevant section of the Bill of Rights also references a hearing.  As Fauteux noted, there was no hearing in this case.  However, it was alleged that if the accused's lawyer had been given the breath sample, a trial would follow in which evidence regarding the breath sample would be debated.  Fauteux replied that the denial of access to evidence does not breach the right to a fair trial unless the law mandates access to such evidence. According to the Criminal Code and its history, such access is not guaranteed.

The case also involved consideration of section 2(f) of the Bill of Rights, which states that no law shall "deprive a person charged with a criminal offence of the right to be presumed innocent until proved guilty according to law in a fair and public hearing by an independent and impartial tribunal, or of the right to reasonable bail without just cause." However, the Court noted that section 2(f) does not contain more rights relevant to this case than section 2(e). Therefore, losing the case under section 2(e) implied also losing under section 2(f).

Concurrence
A short concurrence was written by Justice Bora Laskin.  He objected to the majority's finding that the right to a fair trial is not breached if it is in a manner consistent with statutes.

Aftermath
In 1982, when the Canadian Charter of Rights and Freedoms was adopted, section 7 of the Charter included a right to fundamental justice with respect to laws limiting the right to life, liberty and security of person.  In Re B.C. Motor Vehicle Act (1985), the Supreme Court once again had to consider the meaning of the term "fundamental justice."  According to Justice Lamer, those who argued fundamental justice meant natural justice placed "Considerable emphasis" on the precedent established by Duke.  Ultimately, however, the Supreme Court extended the meaning of fundamental justice beyond natural justice.

References

External links
Full text of the decision

Canadian civil rights case law
Supreme Court of Canada cases
1972 in Canadian case law